G. maculata may refer to:

 Gaeana maculata, an Asian cicada
 Granata maculata, a sea snail
 Gandaritis maculata, a geometer moth
 Gasteria maculata, a succulent plant
 Geckolepis maculata, a Malagasy gecko
 Genetta maculata, an African mammal
 Genocidaris maculata, a sea urchin
 Gilia maculata, a phlox endemic to California
 Gliricidia maculata, an ornamental tree
 Gloxinia maculata, a herbaceous plant
 Glycymeris maculata, a saltwater clam
 Glyphipterix maculata, a sedge moth
 Gongora maculata, a New World orchid
 Gorgasia maculata, a garden eel
 Granata maculata, a sea snail
 Graphomya maculata, a European fly